Westhouse Wood is a  nature reserve north-west of Colchester in Essex. It is managed by the Essex Wildlife Trust.

The wood is mainly coppiced hazel, and other tree include small-leaved lime, crab apple, oak, ash, sweet chestnut, field maple and rowan. There are flowering plants such as wood anemones and foxgloves.

There is access from a slip road off the B1508 road.

References

 Essex Wildlife Trust